Huon District (alternatively Huon Gulf District) is a district of the Morobe Province of Papua New Guinea.  Its capital is Salamaua.  The population of the district was 77,564 at the 2011 census.

References

Districts of Papua New Guinea
Morobe Province